Lâm Bình is a rural district of Tuyên Quang province in the Northeast region of Vietnam. It is a new district in Vietnam, created in January 2011. Its area came from communes of Na Hang district and Chiêm Hoá district. As of 2011 the district had a population of 29,459. The district covers an area of 781.522 km². The district capital is under construction.

Communes
8 communes are:
Lăng Can (considered as capital)
Bình An
Hồng Quang
Khuôn Hà
Phúc Yên
Thổ Bình
Thượng Lâm
Xuân Lập

References

Districts of Tuyên Quang province
Tuyên Quang province